Pašić,  Pasić  is a South Slavic surname derived from Paša. It may refer to:

Feliks Pašić
Ilijas Pašić (born 1934), retired Yugoslav football player and coach
Tatjana Pašić (born 1964), Serbian politician
Nikola Pašić (1845–1926), Serbian politician and diplomat
Nikola Pasic (ice hockey)
Predrag Pašić (born 1958), retired Bosnian football player
Taida Pasić
Teofil Pašić

Serbo-Croatian-language surnames